D'Abadie is a community located in the Tunapuna-Piarco regional corporation in Trinidad and Tobago. Its population is 5,827 people. Some businesses include Arawak Chicken Factory, D'Abadie Discount Hardware Limited and PriceSmart Wholesale Club. Some schools include Pinehaven S.D.A. Primary School and D'abadie Government Primary School. One of its attractions is Cleaver Woods, a park dedicated to the history and culture of the indigenous Caribs.

The current member of parliament for D'Abadie is Ancil Antoine.

References

Populated places in Trinidad and Tobago